Mary Elizabeth Dawson (9 May 1833–22 February 1924) was a New Zealand servant, farmer, environmentalist and nurse. She was born in Mersham, Kent, England on 9 May 1833.

References

1833 births
1924 deaths
New Zealand farmers
New Zealand women farmers
New Zealand nurses
English emigrants to New Zealand
New Zealand environmentalists
New Zealand women environmentalists
19th-century New Zealand people
New Zealand women nurses
People from Mersham